Cappparis micracantha is a species of flowering plant in the caper family (Capparaceae). It grows as a shrub or small tree, sometimes with a more or less climbing habit.

It is native to Southeast Asia - the Andaman and Nicobar Islands, Indochina, Indonesia and the Philippines. Certain parts of the plant are locally used as a source of medicines and rarely for food.

Subspecies
The Catalogue of Life lists:
 The nominate subspecies C. micracantha micracantha
 C. micracantha korthalsiana (Miq.) M.Jacobs (was  C. korthalsiana Miq.)
 C. micracantha var. henryi (Matsum.) M.Jacobs (a synonym of C. henryi) is accepted in the Plant List.

Gallery

References

External links

micrantha
Flora of Indo-China
Taxa named by Augustin Pyramus de Candolle